Angeghakot is a village in the Sisian Municipality of the Syunik Province in Armenia. A large reservoir, the Angeghakot Reservoir, spanning more than the entire length of the village lies to the south.

Demographics 
In 1908, Angeghakot, then known as Angelaut, had a predominantly Armenian population of 1,520 within the Zangezur uezd of the Elizavetpol Governorate of the Russian Empire. The Statistical Committee of Armenia reported its population as 2,057 in 2010, up from 1,860 at the 2001 census.

Notable people 
Oksen Mirzoyan, Olympic, world and European champion in weightlifting

Gallery

References 

Populated places in Syunik Province